Million Dollar Baby is a 2004 American sports drama film directed, co-produced, scored by and starring Clint Eastwood from a screenplay written by Paul Haggis, based on stories from the 2000 collection Rope Burns: Stories from the Corner by F.X. Toole, the pen name of fight manager and cutman Jerry Boyd. It also stars Hilary Swank, and Morgan Freeman. The film follows Margaret "Maggie" Fitzgerald (Swank), an underdog amateur boxer who is helped by an underappreciated boxing trainer (Eastwood) to achieve her dream of becoming a professional.

Million Dollar Baby was theatrically released on December 15, 2004, by Warner Bros. Pictures. It received critical acclaim and grossed $216.8 million worldwide. The film garnered seven nominations at the 77th Academy Awards and won four: Best Picture, Best Director, Best Actress (for Swank), and Best Supporting Actor (for Freeman).

Plot
Margaret "Maggie" Fitzgerald, a waitress from the Ozarks, shows up at the Hit Pit, a rundown Los Angeles gym owned and operated by Frankie Dunn. Dunn is a cantankerous Irish-American trainer, revealed to be estranged from his own daughter. Maggie asks Frankie to train her, but he refuses as he does not train women and she is too old to begin a boxing career. Eddie "Scrap-Iron" Dupris, Frankie's friend and employee—the film's narrator—encourages and helps Maggie. 
Frankie's prize prospect, "Big Willie" Little, signs with successful manager Mickey Mack after becoming impatient with Frankie rejecting offers for a championship bout. Frankie then reluctantly agrees to train Maggie.

Maggie fights her way up in the women's amateur boxing division with Frankie's coaching. Since she has earned a reputation for quick KOs, Frankie must resort to bribery to get other managers to put their trainee fighters up against her. Scrap, concerned when Frankie rejects several offers for big fights, arranges a meeting for Maggie with Mickey Mack, but out of loyalty to Frankie, she declines. Frankie bestows Maggie a Gaelic nickname, embroidered on her boxing robe, Mo Chuisle (misspelled in the film as "mo cuishle"), but does not tell her its meaning. The two travel to Europe as she continues to win; Maggie eventually saves up enough of her winnings to buy her mother a house, but her mother berates Maggie for endangering her government aid, claiming that everyone back home is laughing at her.

Frankie is finally willing to arrange a title fight. He secures Maggie a $1 million match in Las Vegas against the WBA women's welterweight champion, Billie "The Blue Bear" Osterman, a German ex-prostitute who has a reputation as a dirty fighter. Maggie begins to dominate the fight, but Billie knocks her out with an illegal sucker punch from behind after the bell rings to end the round. Maggie lands hard on her corner stool, breaking her neck and leaving her a ventilator-dependent quadriplegic.
Frankie is shown experiencing the first three of the five stages of grief: first seeking multiple doctors' opinions in denial, then blaming Scrap in anger and later trying to bargain with God through prayer.
While in the hospital, Maggie looks forward to a visit from her family. They arrive only after first touring Disneyland and Universal Studios Hollywood. Accompanied by an attorney, their sole concern is to get Maggie's assets transferred to them. Disgusted, she orders them to leave and threatens to report their welfare fraud if they try to contact her again.

Maggie soon develops bedsores and undergoes an amputation for an infected leg. She then asks Frankie to help her die, declaring that she got everything she wanted out of life.  A horrified Frankie refuses, so Maggie later bites her own tongue in an attempt to bleed to death. Knowing the fatherly affection Frankie has developed for Maggie, Frankie's priest warns him that he would never find himself again if he were to go through with Maggie's request. Frankie then sneaks into the hospital one night, unaware that Scrap is watching from the shadows. Just before administering a fatal injection of adrenaline, he tells Maggie the meaning of "mo chuisle": "my darling, and my blood." He never returns to the gym. Scrap's narration is revealed to be a letter to Frankie's daughter, informing her of her father's true character.

Cast
 Clint Eastwood as Frankie Dunn, a gruff but well-meaning elderly boxing trainer.
 Hilary Swank as Mary Margaret "Maggie" Fitzgerald, a determined, aspiring boxer trained up by Frankie Dunn.
 Morgan Freeman as Eddie "Scrap-Iron" Dupris, Dunn's gym assistant and former boxer.
 Jay Baruchel as Dangerous Dillard Fighting Flippo Bam-Bam Barch or "Danger", a simpleton would-be boxer.
 Mike Colter as Willie "Big Willie" Little, a boxer whom Dunn has trained for years.
 Lucia Rijker as Billie "The Blue Bear" Osterman, a former prostitute and vicious boxer.
 Brían F. O'Byrne as Father Horvak, the priest of the church which Dunn attends.
 Anthony Mackie as Shawrelle Berry, an overzealous boxer and frequent tenant of Dunn's gym.
 Margo Martindale as Earline Fitzgerald, Maggie's selfish mother.
 Marcus Chait as J.D. Fitzgerald, Maggie's incarcerated brother.
 Riki Lindhome as Mardell Fitzgerald, Maggie's welfare-cheating sister.
 Michael Peña as Omar, a boxer and Shawrelle's best friend.
 Benito Martinez as Billie's Manager
 Bruce MacVittie as Mickey Mack
 Grant L. Roberts as Billie's Cut Man

Development and production
After being fired from the television series Family Law, Haggis wrote the script on spec, and it took four years to sell it. The film was stuck in development hell for years before it was shot. Several studios rejected the project even when Eastwood signed on as actor and director. Even Warner Bros., Eastwood's longtime home base, would not agree to a $30 million budget. Eastwood persuaded Lakeshore Entertainment's Tom Rosenberg to put up half the budget (as well as handle foreign distribution), with Warner Bros. contributing the rest. Eastwood shot the film in less than 40 days between June and July 2004. Filming took place in Los Angeles and film sets at Warner Bros. Studios. The term 'Million Dollar Baby' was from the nose art of a World War II Consolidated B-24 Liberator heavy bomber.  The titular phrase 'million dollar baby' was used as an insult during pre-fight publicity by Sonny Liston to Muhammad Ali, the latter of whom was an underdog at the time.  Eastwood had his daughter Morgan Colette appear in a brief role as a girl who waves to Swank's character at a gas station.

Eastwood had confidence in Swank's acting, but upon seeing Swank's small physique, he had concerns, "I just thought, 'Yeah, this gal would be great. If we can get her trained up. If we can get a little bit more bulk on her, to make her look like a fighter'...She was like a feather. But what happened is, she had this great work ethic."

Consequently, to prepare for her role, Swank underwent extensive training in the ring and weight room, gaining 19 pounds of muscle, aided by professional trainer Grant L. Roberts. She trained for nearly five hours every day, winding up with a potentially life-threatening staphylococcus infection. She did not tell Eastwood about the infection because she thought it would be out of character for Maggie.

Reception

Box office
Million Dollar Baby initially had a limited release, opening in eight theaters in December 2004. In its later wide release opening, the film earned $12,265,482 in North America and quickly became a box-office hit both domestically and internationally. It grossed $216,763,646 in theaters; $100,492,203 in the United States, and $116,271,443 in other territories. The film played in theaters for six and a half months.

Critical response
On Rotten Tomatoes, Million Dollar Baby has an approval rating of 90% based on 269 reviews, with an average rating of 8.40/10. The website's critical consensus reads, "Clint Eastwood's assured direction—combined with knockout performances from Hilary Swank and Morgan Freeman—help Million Dollar Baby to transcend its clichés, and the result is deeply heartfelt and moving." On Metacritic it has a weighted average score of 86 out of 100, based on reviews from 39 critics, indicating "universal acclaim". Audiences polled by CinemaScore gave the film a grade "A" on an A+ to F scale.

Roger Ebert of the Chicago Sun Times gave the film four stars and stated that "Clint Eastwood's Million Dollar Baby is a masterpiece, pure and simple," listing it as the best film of 2004. Michael Medved stated: "My main objection to Million Dollar Baby always centered on its misleading marketing, and effort by Warner Brothers to sell it as a movie about a female Rocky, with barely a hint of the pitch-dark substance that led Andrew Sarris of the New York Observer ... to declare that 'no movie in my memory has depressed me more than Million Dollar Baby.'"

In early 2005, the film sparked controversy when some disability rights activists protested the ending. The Disability Rights Education Fund released a statement about the film in February 2005 that included the following: "Perhaps the most central stereotype fueling disability prejudice is the mistaken assumption inherent in the message of the movie that the quality of life of individuals with disabilities is unquestionably not worth living. This stereotype is contradicted by the personal experience of many thousands of people with significant disabilities in this country and around the world who view our own lives as ordinary and normal. It is further contradicted by plenty of hard data. Research overwhelmingly shows that people with disabilities find satisfaction in our lives to the same degree, or greater, than does the general public." The Chicago Tribune reported that protests against the film by disability activists occurred in Chicago, Berkeley, and other cities, and that Clint Eastwood had previously lobbied for weakening provisions of the Americans with Disabilities Act.

Wesley J. Smith in The Weekly Standard also criticized the film for its ending and for missed opportunities; Smith said, "The movie could have ended with Maggie triumphing once again, perhaps having obtained an education and becoming a teacher; or, opening a business managing boxers; or perhaps, receiving a standing ovation as an inspirational speaker."

Eastwood responded to the criticism by saying the film was about the American dream. In an interview with the Los Angeles Times, Eastwood distanced himself from the actions of characters in his films, noting, "I've gone around in movies blowing people away with a .44 Magnum. But that doesn't mean I think that's a proper thing to do". Roger Ebert stated that "a movie is not good or bad because of its content, but because of how it handles its content. Million Dollar Baby is classical in the clean, clear, strong lines of its story and characters, and had an enormous emotional impact".

The Gaelic nickname for Swank's character comes from the original phrase a chuisle mo chroí, meaning "O pulse of my heart"; one critic noted that the use of Gaelic in the film led to some interest in the language and the phrase.

Top ten lists
Million Dollar Baby was listed on many critics' top ten lists for films released in 2004.
 1st – A.O. Scott & Manohla Dargis, The New York Times
 1st – Roger Ebert, Chicago Sun-Times
 1st – Lou Lumenick, New York Post
 2nd – Richard Schickel, Time
 2nd – Lisa Schwarzbaum, Entertainment Weekly
 2nd – Jonathan Rosenbaum, Chicago Reader
 2nd – Claudia Puig, USA Today
 2nd – Keith Phipps, The A.V. Club
 2nd – Ty Burr & Wesley Morris, Boston Globe
 3rd – Kevin Thomas & Kenneth Turan, Los Angeles Times
 3rd – Jack Matthews, New York Daily News
 3rd – Glenn Kenny, Premiere
 3rd – Carla Meyer & Ruthie Stein, San Francisco Chronicle
 3rd – Peter Travers, Rolling Stone
 4th – Mike Clark, USA Today
 4th – David Ansen, Newsweek
 4th – Jami Bernard, New York Daily News
 5th – Robert Koehler, Variety
 5th – James Berardinelli, Reelviews
 6th – Stephen Holden, The New York Times
 6th – Scott Tobias, The A.V. Club
 6th – Richard Roeper, Ebert & Roeper
 9th – Desson Thompson, Washington Post
 10th – Nathan Rabin, The A.V. Club
 Top 10 (listed alphabetically) – Ron Stringer, L.A. Weekly
 Top 10 (listed alphabetically) – David Sterritt, Christian Science Monitor
 Top 10 (listed alphabetically)– Shawn Levy, Portland Oregonian
 Top 10 (listed alphabetically) – Carrie Rickey & Steven Rea, Philadelphia Inquirer

Accolades
Million Dollar Baby received the award for Best Picture of 2004 at the 77th Academy Awards. Clint Eastwood was awarded his second Best Director Oscar for the film, and also received a Best Actor in a Leading Role nomination. Hilary Swank and Morgan Freeman received Best Actress in a Leading Role and Best Actor in a Supporting Role Oscars, respectively. Joel Cox, Eastwood's editor for many years, was nominated for Best Film Editing, and Paul Haggis was nominated for the Best Adapted Screenplay award.

The film was named the third "Best Film of the 21st Century So Far" in 2017 by The New York Times.

Home media
The film was released on VHS and DVD on July 12, 2005, and all editions of the Region 1 DVD, except for the "Deluxe Edition", came with a paperback copy of the book Rope Burns: Stories from the Corner. An HD DVD release was issued on April 18, 2006. The Blu-ray Disc version was released on November 14, 2006. It was the first Best Picture winner released on either high-definition optical disc format in the U.S.; it and Unforgiven (also starring Eastwood and Freeman) were the only ones released in the U.S. on HD DVD prior to the first one released in the U.S. on Blu-ray, Crash. The film is also available online through video on demand and most major streaming platforms.

See also

 Cinema of the United States
 List of American films of 2004

References

Bibliography

External links

 
 
 
 
 
 
 US News article: Million Dollar Maybe, A real-life version of Maggie Fitzgerald
 Another possible real-life Maggie Fitzgerald
 Million Dollar Baby at the Sports Movie Database

2004 films
American sports drama films
2000s sports drama films
American boxing films
Films directed by Clint Eastwood
Films produced by Clint Eastwood
Best Foreign Film César Award winners
Best Picture Academy Award winners
Films about euthanasia
Films about paraplegics or quadriplegics
Films about women's sports
Films based on short fiction
Films featuring a Best Actress Academy Award-winning performance
Films featuring a Best Drama Actress Golden Globe-winning performance
Films featuring a Best Supporting Actor Academy Award-winning performance
Films whose director won the Best Directing Academy Award
Films whose director won the Best Director Golden Globe
Lakeshore Entertainment films
Malpaso Productions films
Films with screenplays by Paul Haggis
Films produced by Tom Rosenberg
Films produced by Gary Lucchesi
2000s feminist films
Films about suicide
Films about death
Films scored by Clint Eastwood
Warner Bros. films
2004 drama films
National Society of Film Critics Award for Best Film winners
2000s English-language films
2000s American films
Films about disability